Bonnici is a Maltese surname. Notable people with the surname include:

Brittany Bonnici (born 1997), Australian rules footballer
Carmelo Mifsud Bonnici (born 1960), Maltese politician who served in a number of Ministerial posts in the Government of Malta
Giuseppe Mifsud Bonnici (1930–2019), Maltese retired Chief Justice, and minor philosopher
Francis Bonnici (1853–1905), Maltese educationist, philanthropist and a minor philosopher
James Bonnici (born 1972), former professional baseball player
Karmenu Mifsud Bonnici (born 1933), Maltese politician
Owen Bonnici (born 1980), Maltese politician
Ugo Mifsud Bonnici (born 1932), Maltese politician

See also
 Bonici (disambiguation)